The Man Who Reclaimed His Head is a 1934 American drama film directed by Edward Ludwig and written by Jean Bart and Samuel Ornitz. The film stars Claude Rains, Joan Bennett, Lionel Atwill, Juanita Quigley, Henry O'Neill and Henry Armetta. The film was released on December 24, 1934, by Universal Pictures.

Plot 

Paul Verin walks through the streets of 1915 Paris carrying his small daughter Linette on one arm and a black satchel on the other. Arriving at the home of Paul's boyhood friend, attorney Fernand De Marnay, Paul relates the events that led him there.

Five years ago Paul and his wife Adele lived in Clichy. They lived off what Paul could make with his political writings.  Adele loves Paul but she is unhappy living in Clichy. She wants to live in Paris. To make enough money to move to Paris, Paul accepts an offer to write political articles for aspiring politician Henri Dumont agreeing to let Dumont take credit as the author. Dumont has political aspirations and the anti-war editorials make Dumont popular. Paul and wife are able to live in Paris comfortably. Dumont's rising popularity attracts the interest of a group of wealthy arms dealers who would like the editorials to move toward a pro-war viewpoint. Paul is an avowed pacifist and refuses to write such articles for Dumont.

When war breaks out, Dumont uses his influence to see that Paul is sent to the front. Paul becomes a corporal and see action at Verdun. Paul is given leave to see Adele. At the railroad station, Paul finds his leave has been cancelled. He hears a rumor that not only is Dumont spending time with Adele but Dumont is also responsible for his leave being cancelled. On hearing this, Paul boards the train to Paris. He is arrives at his home and discovers Dumont attempting to force himself on Adele. Enraged, Paul uses his bayonet to kill Dumont.

Paul reveals the contents of his satchel to de Mornay. While not graphically shown on screen, the implication of the scene is that the satchel contains the severed head of Dumont. Paul had 'lost his ‘head’ to Dumont and now he has it back.

Adele arrives with the police. De Mornay will be able to get an acquittal for Paul.

Cast 
Claude Rains as Paul Verin
Joan Bennett as Adele Verin
Lionel Atwill as Henry Dumont
Juanita Quigley as Linette Verin
Henry O'Neill as Fernand de Marnay
Henry Armetta as Laurent
Wallace Ford as 'Curly'
Lawrence Grant as Marchant
William B. Davidson as Charles
Harry Cording as French Mechanic (uncredited)
Maurice Murphy as Leon - a Soldier (uncredited)
Edward Van Sloan as Board Director (uncredited)

Production 
The film was based on a 1932 stage play which also starred Rains. Jean Arthur played Verin's wife. In the play, the character of Paul Verin was physically malformed and suffered from various ailments. In the film, he did not. Though it isn't known why the change was made, it was likely Rains' choice.

Neither the play or the film were successful. The play closed after only 23 performances and the film was did not sell many tickets.

References

External links 
 
 

1934 films
1930s English-language films
American drama films
1934 drama films
Universal Pictures films
Films directed by Edward Ludwig
American black-and-white films
Films set in the 1910s
Films set in Paris
Films scored by Heinz Roemheld
American films based on plays
1930s American films
Films produced by Carl Laemmle Jr.